This is a list of rivers of the Philippines.

Luzon
Abra River
Abulog River
Agno River
Angat River
Apayao River
Balili River
Bay River
Bicol River
 Libmanan River
 Mangayawan River
 Naga River
 Yabu River
Bued River
Cabuyao River
Cagayan River
Baligatan River
Calao River
Chico River
Diadi River
Ilagan River
Magat River
Mallig River
Pinacanauan River
Siffu River
Calumpang River (Batangas)
Ifugao River
Lawaye River
Lobo River
Mangangate River
Marikina River (Metro Manila)
Maygñaway River (on Catanduanes)
Morong River
Navotas River
Padsan River
Guisit River
Pagsanjan River (Laguna)
Pampanga River
Pangil River (Laguna)
Pansipit River
Parañaque River 
Pasig River (Metro Manila)
San Juan River
Taguig River (Metro Manila)
San Juan River
San Cristobal River (Laguna)
Santa Cruz River
Sapang Baho River
Siniloan River
Tarlac River
Tullahan River
Tunasan River
Umiray River
 Yawa River
Zapote River

Visayas
Abatan River, Bohol
Aklan River, Panay
Anilao River, Leyte
Banica River, Negros Island
Bojo River, Cebu
Butuanon River, Cebu
Catarman River, Northern Samar
Catubig River, Northern Samar
Hilabangan River
Iloilo River, Panay
Inabanga River, Bohol
Jalaur River, Panay
Kamputhaw River, Cebu
Loboc River, Bohol
Malbasag River, Leyte
Matutinao River, Cebu
Pambujan River, Northern Samar
Panay River, Panay
Silmugi River, Cebu
Subangdaku River, Southern Leyte
Ulot River, Samar

Mindanao
Agus River
Agusan River
Sibagat River
Wawa River
Umayam River
Buayan River
Cagayan de Oro River 
Bubunaoan River
Kalawaig River
Tagite River
Davao River
Salug River
Guagua River
Malungon River
Mandulog River (Iligan City)
Rio Grande de Mindanao
Libungan River
Pulangi River
Bobonawan River
Tigwa River
Manupali River
Muleta River
Sawaga River
Maradugao River
Kabacan River
Buluan River
Allah River
Tagum River
Libuganon River
Tagoloan River
Initao River (Initao, Mis. Or.)
Talabaan River (Naawan, Mis. Or)
Manticao River (Manticao, Mis. Or.)

Longest rivers in the Philippines

References 

Philippines
 
Rivers